Étoile Football Club Fréjus Saint-Raphaël (commonly referred to as Fréjus Saint-Raphaël) is a French association football club based in the neighboring communes of Fréjus and Saint-Raphaël. The club was formed in 2009 as a result of a merger between ES Fréjus and Stade Raphaëlois and currently play in the Championnat National 2, the fourth level of French football. Fréjus Saint-Raphaël plays its home matches at the Stade Louis Hon in Fréjus.

Players

Current squad

Notable players 
For notable former Fréjus Saint-Raphaël players, see :Category:ÉFC Fréjus Saint-Raphaël players.

Honours

Fréjus 
 Division 4: 1991
 Division d'Honneur (Méditerranée): 1986

Saint-Raphaël 
 USFSA Championship: 1912
 Division d'Honneur (Méditerranée): 1980
 USFSA League (Côte d'Azur) (6): 1908, 1909, 1911, 1912, 1913, 1914

References

External links 
Official website

 
2009 establishments in France
Association football clubs established in 2009
Sport in Var (department)
Football clubs in Provence-Alpes-Côte d'Azur